William Davies (27 December 1890 – 18 September 1967), also known by the nickname of "Avon", was a Welsh dual-code international rugby union, and professional rugby league footballer who played in the 1910s and 1920s.

Playing career

Rugby union career
Davies began playing rugby union as a schoolboy playing for both Aberavon Council School and Port Talbot County School. The first notable club that Davies represented was Aberavon, and it was from Aberavon that Davies was first selected to represent the Wales national team. Davies played two international games for Wales, both as part of the 1912 Five Nations Championship. Davies' first cap was against Scotland played at St Helen's, which Wales won 21–6. Davies was selected for the next Wales match of the tournament, an away encounter to Ireland. The game started well for Wales, with Davies scoring his only international points, a try in the first half which was converted by Jack Bancroft. Despite Wales leading 5–0, the more experienced Irish team came back in the second half winning 12–5.

By the end of 1912, Davies had switched clubs from Aberavon to Swansea, and in October he was selected to play for county team Glamorgan when they faced the second touring South African team. Davies was not originally a first choice for the team, with Cardiff's Billy Spiller chosen not only as centre but also team captain. Three of the backs selected for the encounter, Spiller, Swansea centre Alf Thomas and fullback Jack Bancroft were all withdrawn injured after the teams met in a club clash the previous Saturday. Davies was called in to replace Spiller and was also given the captaincy. The match was a one-sided competition with the South Africans running out winners by 35 points to 3.

Davies played in his rugby in two parts of the United Kingdom, in Wales it was for Swansea, Glamoragn and Wales, while in the South of England he played for Exeter University, Plymouth Albion, and county rugby for Devon. In 1913 he was suspended by both Wales and Devon for alleged professionalism, and in March he decided to sever links with the union game by 'Going North' and joining Leeds R.L.F.C.

Rugby league honours
Davies won two caps for Wales while at Leeds in 1914 and 1921, and won caps for Great Britain in 1914 against Australia, and New Zealand. Davies played right-, i.e. number 3, in Leeds' 2–35 defeat by Huddersfield in the Championship Final during the 1914–15 season, and in the 11–3 victory over Dewsbury in the 1921 Yorkshire County Cup Final during the 1921–22 season at Thrum Hall, Halifax on Saturday 26 November 1921.

References

External links
!Great Britain Statistics at englandrl.co.uk (statistics currently missing due to not having appeared for both Great Britain, and England)

1890 births
1967 deaths
Aberavon RFC players
Academics of the University of Exeter
Dual-code rugby internationals
Glamorgan County RFC players
Great Britain national rugby league team players
Leeds Rhinos players
Other Nationalities rugby league team players
Plymouth Albion R.F.C. players
Rugby league players from Aberavon
Rugby league wingers
Rugby union players from Aberavon
Swansea RFC players
Wales international rugby union players
Wales national rugby league team players
Welsh rugby league players
Welsh rugby union players